Phytomyza aquilegivora, the columbine leafminer, is a species of leaf miner fly in the family Agromyzidae.

References

Phytomyza
Articles created by Qbugbot
Insects described in 1969

https://hort.extension.wisc.edu/articles/common-columbine-pests-columbine-leafminer-and-columbine-sawfly/